Bastardiastrum is a genus of flowering plants in the mallow family Malvaceae and is native to Mexico. They are shrubs or subshrubs with viscid (and usually malodorous) stems.

Species
Currently accepted species include:
 
Bastardiastrum batesii Fryxell & S.D.Koch
Bastardiastrum cinctum (Brandegee) D.M.Bates
Bastardiastrum gracile (Hochr.) D.M.Bates
Bastardiastrum hirsutiflorum (C.Presl) D.M.Bates
Bastardiastrum incanum (Brandegee) D.M.Bates
Bastardiastrum tarasoides Fryxell
Bastardiastrum tricarpellatum (B.L.Rob. & Greenm.) D.M.Bates
Bastardiastrum wissaduloides (Baker f.) D.M.Bates

References

Malveae
Malvaceae genera